"Wolves" is a song by American singer Selena Gomez and music producer Marshmello. The song was written by Gomez, Ali Tamposi, Louis Bell, Brian Lee, and its producers Marshmello and Andrew Watt. The song was released by Interscope Records on October 25, 2017.

Commercially, the song has topped the charts in Latvia, Poland and Serbia while reaching the top 10 in 23 additional countries; as well as the top 20 in Germany and the United States. It was also the second-most successful electronic song of 2018 in the US. The single is certified Platinum or higher in fifteen countries worldwide, including Diamond in Brazil.

Release and promotion
Marshmello first revealed the song on July 22, 2017, when he tweeted: "Happy birthday Selena Gomez! Can't wait for the world to hear what we've been working on." On August 15, 2017, Marshmello wrote that Gomez "sounds absolutely incredible" on the song, when replying to a fan who asked him about the collaboration. During a radio interview with Tonya and Sonic on San Diego's Energy 103.7 FM, Gomez said: "It's really cool. It's kind of in that world, his world, and I'm stepping into it and bringing my style too." She called it a beautiful song and one of her favorites. On September 25, 2017, a follower of Gomez reached out to Marshmello via Twitter for a "tip" about the song, to which Marshmello replied: "Coming very very soon," leading to speculation on the song's release. On October 6, 2017, Marshmello reassured fans that the song is "coming very soon".

On October 19, 2017, both Gomez and Marshmello took to social media to officially announce the song and its release date. Gomez shared pictures of her wearing a pink version of Marshmello's helmet, another photos shows the two sitting on a couch eating popcorn. The song premiered via the radio show Beats 1, the host Zane Lowe named it the day's "World Record".

Composition
"Wolves" was written by Selena Gomez, Marshmello, Ali Tamposi, Andrew Watt, Brian Lee, and Louis Bell. The song was described as a "sticky electronic snack" and "propulsive EDM" which is equally "acoustic-laced EDM and long, lost 80's pop". Caitlin Kelley from Billboard noted how Marshmello's influence in the song can be heard through "subtle trap elements, like the triple high hats buzzing beneath the smoky atmosphere." "Wolves" opens "dark and gloomy" with Gomez singing over a clean electric guitar as Kat Bein from Billboard commented, the build of the bridge is "almost country-pop, but the choral hook is all Marshmello sweetness." In an interview with Zane Lowe for Beats 1, Gomez stated that the lyrics deeply reflects what she was feeling during the period she recorded the track.

Music video
On November 2, 2017, Gomez released the vertical video for the single exclusively through Spotify. It was later released via her official Vevo account. The video is a FaceTime between Gomez and Marshmello.

On November 17, the official video premiered on the iTunes Store and Apple Music and it was directed by Colin Tilley. The video features Gomez wearing different outfits in various parts of an indoor swimming pool facility. Near the end of the video, Gomez walks on the water of the swimming pool. The video was released on Vevo and YouTube a day later on Gomez's account.

Commercial performance
"Wolves" entered at number 16 on the UK Singles Chart. Three weeks later, it ascended to number nine and became Gomez's fourth top 10 entry in the nation. In Australia, the song entered at number 15 on the ARIA Singles Chart. It has reached number five there and is her second-highest-peaking song in the country behind another EDM collaboration, "It Ain't Me". After debuting at number 69 on the Canadian Hot 100, it rose to number nine the following week and has been certified double Platinum by Music Canada (MC) for accumulating 160,000 equivalent units. The song was certified double Platinum by the RIAA for accumulating two million equivalent units.

Live performances
On November 19, 2017, Gomez and Marshmello performed "Wolves" live for the first time at the 2017 American Music Awards. On May 29, 2021, Gomez and Marshmello performed the song at the 2021 UEFA Champions League Final.

Track listing
Digital download
 "Wolves" – 3:17

Digital download – Total Ape remix
 "Wolves" (Total Ape remix) – 3:05

Digital download – Sneek remix
 "Wolves" (Sneek remix) – 4:34

Digital download – Said the Sky remix
 "Wolves" (Said the Sky remix) – 3:28

Digital download – Rusko remix
 "Wolves" (Rusko remix) – 3:46

Digital download – Owen Norton remix
 "Wolves" (Owen Norton remix) – 4:28

Digital download – MOTi remix
 "Wolves" (MOTi remix) – 4:05

Credits and personnel
Credits and personnel adapted from Rare album liner notes.

 Selena Gomez – lead vocals, songwriting
 Marshmello – production, songwriting
 Andrew Watt – production, songwriting
 Louis Bell – vocal engineering, songwriting
 Ali Tamposi – songwriting

 Brian D. Lee – songwriting
 Benjamin Rice – engineering
 Serban Ghenea – mixing
 John Hanes – mix engineering
 Chris Gehringer – mastering

Charts

Weekly charts

Monthly charts

Year-end charts

Decade-end charts

Certifications

Release history

References

2017 songs
2017 singles
Electronic dance music songs
Selena Gomez songs
Marshmello songs
Music videos directed by Colin Tilley
Interscope Records singles
Songs written by Selena Gomez
Songs written by Ali Tamposi
Songs written by Andrew Watt (record producer)
Songs written by Brian Lee (songwriter)
Number-one singles in Poland
Songs written by Louis Bell
Songs written by Marshmello
Vertically-oriented music videos
Songs about wolves